Red Wing Regional Airport  is a city-owned public-use airport located in Pierce County, Wisconsin, three nautical miles (6 km) northeast of the central business district of Red Wing, a city in Goodhue County, Minnesota, United States.

Although most U.S. airports use the same three-letter location identifier for the FAA and IATA, this airport is assigned RGK by the FAA but has no designation from the IATA. It is included in the Federal Aviation Administration (FAA) National Plan of Integrated Airport Systems for 2021–2025, in which it is categorized as a regional general aviation facility.

Facilities and aircraft 
It has one runway designated 9/27 with an asphalt surface measuring 5,010 by 100 feet (1,527 x 30 m).

For the 12-month period ending June 30, 2019, the airport had 14,050 aircraft operations, an average of 38 per day: 93% general aviation, 5% military and 2% air taxi. In December 2021, there were 53 aircraft based at this airport: 34 single-engine, 3 multi-engine and 16 jet.

Accidents and Incidents
On September 6, 2022, a Stoddard-Hamilton Glasair Super II impacted terrain off Highway 35 on airport property.  Two people were killed.

References

External links 
 
 

Airports in Wisconsin
Buildings and structures in Pierce County, Wisconsin
Red Wing, Minnesota